DK3 is the third and final studio album by American R&B/pop group Danity Kane.

DK3 may also refer to:

Media
 The Dark Knight III: The Master Race, a nine-issue DC Comics limited series
 The Denison/Kimball Trio, jazz/post-rock side project by members of The Jesus Lizard

Video games
 Donkey Kong 3, the third video game in the original 'Donkey Kong' series by Nintendo
 Dungeon Keeper 3, a cancelled PC strategy game by Bullfrog Productions

Transportation

 Droga krajowa nr 3, a national road in Poland